The 2012 Eurocup Formula Renault 2.0 season was the 22nd Eurocup Formula Renault 2.0 season. The season commenced on 5 May at Alcañiz and ended on 21 October at Barcelona. The season featured seven double-header rounds, with each race lasting for a duration of 30 minutes. All races were part of the World Series by Renault.

Red Bull Junior's Daniil Kvyat won the opening race of the season at Motorland Aragón after qualifying on pole position by 0.1 seconds. Newcomer Nyck de Vries finished in second place and returnee Stoffel Vandoorne attained his maiden podium in third. The race was red-flagged after a violent crash between Daniel Cammish and Hans Villemi, with Villemi flipping over the back of Cammish's car. Both drivers suffered long-term injuries in the crash, and have yet to return to the series. iRace Professional driver Óscar Tunjo of Tech 1 Racing started the Sunday race from pole position but he was passed by Kvyat at the second turn of the first lap. Kvyat scored his first Eurocup double win, ahead of Tunjo and RC Formula's Norman Nato.

A month later at Spa, R-ace GP's Pierre Gasly claimed his first pole position. Gasly had a bad getaway and lost positions to both Nato and Vandoorne. Nato scored his first win in the series, while Gasly scored his first series podium. Gasly's teammate Andrea Pizzitola was the fastest in the second qualifying session. The race was held in heavy rain, and was red-flagged after an incident at Kemmel, involving Nato and team-mate Javier Tarancón, Koiranen Motorsport's Stefan Wackerbauer and Victor Franzoni, Tunjo and team-mate Matthieu Vaxivière, Fortec Motorsports' Dan de Zille and KTR's Yu Kanamaru. Kvyat coped with conditions better than others, claiming his third win of the season, ahead of Fortec driver Jake Dennis and Vandoorne completed the podium.

The next Eurocup stop was at the Nürburgring, where Vandoorne set the fastest time in qualifying, before he converted pole position into victory. Nato and Tech 1's Paul-Loup Chatin joined Vandoorne on the podium. Vandoorne led from start to finish the next day, claiming the pole and won the race with fastest lap. Interwetten.com Racing's Melville McKee and Gasly completed the podium. Vandoorne's double win gave him the championship lead.

Two weeks later, the series visited Russia for the first time, at the newly inaugurated Moscow Raceway. In both qualification sessions, Vandoorne was faster than Kvyat. However, Kvyat won both races to retake the championship lead from Vandoorne. Vandoorne took a pair of second places in Moscow, while Oliver Rowland took his first Eurocup podiums with a brace of third places.

Teams and drivers

Race calendar and results
The calendar for the 2012 season was announced on 10 October 2011, the day after the end of the 2011 season. Silverstone Circuit was dropped from the calendar in favour of a round at the new Moscow Raceway in Russia. All seven rounds formed meetings of the 2012 World Series by Renault season.

Championship standings
 Points for both championships were awarded as follows:

Drivers' Championship

Teams' Championship
Prior to each round of the championship, two drivers from each team – if applicable – are nominated to score teams' championship points.

References

External links
 Renault-Sport official website

Eurocup Formula Renault 2.0
Eurocup
Renault Eurocup